Lautaro Murúa (29 December 1926 in Tacna, Chile – 3 December 1995 in Madrid) was a Chilean-Argentine actor, film director, and screenwriter. He is one of the best known actors in the cinema of Argentina.

Born in Chile, Murúa moved to Argentina at the beginning of the fifties. He studied architecture and fine arts before entering the film industry. He worked primarily as an actor and appeared in over 80 films between 1949 and his death in 1995 although he also directed a handful of important films such as Shunko, Alias Gardelito and La Raulito, all with stories usually revolving around social topics.

As an actor, Murúa participated in the 1960s film industry revival, acting in the movies of Leopoldo Torre Nilsson, Rodolfo Kuhn, Manuel Antín and David José Kohon.

He moved to Spain in the 1970s, and returned to Argentina to film several movies until he died in Spain in 1995.

Filmography
1957 - La Casa del ángel
1958 - La caída
1958 - Behind a Long Wall 
1958 - The Kidnapper
1960 - The Party Is Over
1960 - Shunko
1961 - Alias Gardelito
1962 - The Venerable Ones
1962 - Odd Number
1965 - El Reñidero
1965 - Pajarito Gómez
1967 - Traitors of San Angel
1969 - Invasión
1974 - Quebracho
1974 - La Raulito
1977 - La Raulito en libertad (Spanish production)
1978 - Las truchas
1980 - La Muchacha de las Bragas de Oro
1983 - Funny Dirty Little War
1984 - Cuarteles de invierno
1984 - Gracias por el Fuego
1986 - Poor Butterfly
1993 - Un Muro de Silencio

External links
 

1926 births
1995 deaths
20th-century Argentine male actors
Argentine film directors
Argentine male film actors
Male screenwriters
Chilean people of Basque descent
Chilean film directors
20th-century Chilean male actors
Chilean male film actors
Chilean screenwriters
People from Tacna
Chilean emigrants to Argentina
20th-century Argentine screenwriters
20th-century Argentine male writers